The 8th LG Cup featured:

12 players from  South Korea - An Choyoung, An Young-gil, Cho Hanseung, Cho Hunhyun, Hong Jang-sik, Kim Joo-ho, Lee Chang-ho, Lee Sedol, Mok Jin-seok, Won Seong-jin, Yoo Changhyuk
5 players from  Japan - Cho Chikun, Hane Naoki, O Meien, O Rissei, Ryu Shikun
4 players from  China - Chang Hao, Wang Lei, Yu Bin, Zhou Heyang
1 player from  Taiwan - Zhou Junxun
1 player from  North America - Michael Redmond
1 player from  Europe - Alexandre Dinerchtein

Out of the 24 players that participated, the holder of the 7th LG Cup, Lee Sedol, and runner-up Lee Chang-ho were given automatic berths.

Final

LG Cup (Go)
2004 in go